Handesh also known as Guror Handesh or as Teler Pitha in Bangladesh is a sweet and puffy deep-fried Pitha which also be eaten as a snack. It is a deep-fried molasses and rice flour cake. In the earlier days, like other Pithas, this delicacy used to be made from rice threshed by the unmotorized Dheki. It is very popular at the time of the Eid and Christmas and also in winter.It can be eaten with tea as a snack. It is also famous on special occasions such as naming ceremonies and wedding festivities. In Assam, India Its called Tel Pitha.

Ingredients 
Molasses or sugar, rice flour, plain flour, water and oil.

Method 
Molasses or sugar is added to a large mixing bowl when water is poured at the same time. There are different types of molasses. 
Rice flour and plain flour are added to make a smooth batter. The batter is thoroughly whisk until it is smooth.
Then oil is poured to deep-fry. Once the oil is hot, the heat is reduced to low–medium. Finally, the batter is dropped one by one to the oil to make the Handesh.

References

See also 

 Pitha
 Bangladeshi cuisine

Sylheti cuisine
Rice dishes
Pitha